The Singapore Human Resources Institute (SHRI) was founded in 1965 and is the not-for-profit professional HR body in Singapore. It represents over 3,000 human resource professionals. 

SHRI releases a bi-monthly magazine Human Capital in Singapore, with a circulation of 10,000 copies.

References

External links 
 Official Website

Professional associations based in Singapore